Dennis Giangreco is an American author. He is also known as D.M. Giangrecco. He is a former editor of Military Review, the publication of the United States Army Combined Arms Center.

Bibliography
 Airbridge to Berlin: The Berlin Crisis of 1948, Its Origins and Aftermath (1988)
 Stealth Fighter Pilot (1993)
 War in Korea, 1950-1953; A Pictorial History (2000)
 Eyewitness D-Day: Firsthand Accounts from the Landing at Normandy to the Liberation of Paris (with Kathryn Moore)(2004)
 Delta: America's Elite Counterterrorist Force (with Terry Griswold) (2005)
 The Soldier from Independence: A Military Biography of Harry Truman (2009)
 Hell to Pay: Operation Downfall and the Invasion of Japan, 1945-1947 (2009)
 United States Army: The Definitive Illustrated History (2011)

References

Year of birth missing (living people)
Date of birth missing (living people)
Living people
American male writers
American  military writers